Kendrick Adams (born November 3, 1988) is a former American football defensive end. He was signed by the Jacksonville Jaguars as an undrafted free agent after 2012 NFL Draft. He played college football at Louisiana State University.

He also played for the Tampa Bay Buccaneers, Detroit Lions, Cleveland Browns and Tennessee Titans.

Professional career

Jacksonville Jaguars
On April 30, 2012, it was announced that Adams signed with the Jacksonville Jaguars as an undrafted free agent. He was waived on September 1, 2012.

Tampa Bay Buccaneers
On September 27, 2012, he was signed to the practice squad by the Tampa Bay Buccaneers. On October 11, 2012, he was released in order to re-sign LB Markus White.

Detroit Lions
On October 24, 2012, he was signed to the practice squad by the Detroit Lions

Cleveland Browns
On January 3, 2013, he was signed by the Cleveland Browns.

New York Giants
On December 10, 2013, Adams was signed by the New York Giants and placed on the practice squad. On December 30, 2013, he was signed to a reserve/futures contract by the Giants. He was waived on August 5, 2014.

Tennessee Titans
Adams then signed with the Tennessee Titans, but was released on August 25, 2014.

References 

Glossary of American football

External links
 Jacksonville Jaguars Bio
 Tampa Bay Buccaneers Bio
 Detroit Lions Bio

1988 births
Living people
People from Enterprise, Alabama
Players of American football from Alabama
American football defensive ends
Louisiana State University alumni
LSU Tigers football players
Jacksonville Jaguars players
Tampa Bay Buccaneers players
Detroit Lions players
New York Giants players
Tennessee Titans players
Copiah-Lincoln Wolfpack football players